Xiaochang'an is a town in Luocheng Mulao Autonomous County, Guangxi, China.

Administrative division
As of 2021, the town is divided into one community and eleven villages: 
 Chang'an Community
 Gui'an
 Shuanghe
 Longteng
 Hebei
 Luodong
 Shoushan
 Niubi
 Xiawu
 Minzu
 Lixin
 Shuangmeng

History
It was incorporated as a township in 1935, during the Republic of China. 

Its name was changed to the "First District" in 1950 and soon renamed "Xiaochang'an District". In 1958, it was renamed "Xiaochang'an People's Commune". It became a township in 1984 and was upgraded to a town in 1993.

Geography
The town is located in the northeast of Luocheng Mulao Autonomous County. It is surrounded by Rongshui Miao Autonomous County on the north and east, the towns of Dongmen and Huangjin on the west, and Liucheng County on the south.

The Wuyang River flows through the town.

Economy
The local economy is primarily based upon agriculture. Significant crops include rice and corn. Sugarcane, peanut, rape are its only cash crops.

Demographics

In 2019, Xiaochang'an had a total population of 40,191 over the whole town.

Transportation
The  passes across the town.

The Provincial Highway S204 is a east–west highway in the town.

The Jiaozuo–Liuzhou railway passes across the town.

References

Bibliography

 

Divisions of Luocheng Mulao Autonomous County